Ellora Patnaik (born September 5, 1968) is a Canadian actress of film, stage and television as well as an Odissi dancer.

Early life
She was born in Toronto, Ontario, Canada, the first child of her parents, Promod and Chitralekha Patnaik; she is seven years older than her brother Devraj Patnaik. Her parents were born in the state of Orissa (now Odisha), India, and immigrated to Canada in the 1960s. Patnaik made numerous trips to India with her family in her youth.

Her parents soon moved to Oakville, Ontario, and then to Burlington, Ontario, where she attended M. M. Robinson High School.

In 1986, she was selected for training by (late) Padma Vibhushan Kelucharan Mohapatra, and went to study at the Odissi Research Centre in Orissa, India.

Dance training
Patnaik's first and primary dance guru was her mother, who began training her as an Odissi dancer from a very young age. She has also received training from such notables as (late) Padmashri Pankaj Charan Das, (late) Padmabibhusan Kelucharan Mohapatra, Padmashri Sanjukta Panigrahi and Padmashri Gangadhar Pradhan.

Acting
She attended the American Academy of Dramatic Arts from 1992 to 1994 and was a member of the company in her third year.

In 2009, she played Jyoti Mehta, Indie Mehta's mother, in the Canadian television series How to Be Indie on YTV, she filmed another season in 2010.

Career

Film

Television

Odissi dance teacher
Patnaik has taught Odissi dance since the mid-1980s. In the early 1990s, she took over as the executive director of the Chitralekha Dance Academy.

Theatre work

See also

 List of Canadian actors
 List of dancers
 List of Indo-Canadians
 List of people from New York City
 List of people from Oakville, Ontario
 List of people from Odisha
 List of people from Toronto

References

External links
 
 Chitralekha Odissi Dance Creations website
 Chandra, Sarat (undated).  "Mira Nair's New Girl".  odissi.itgo.com.  Retrieved October 10, 2013.

1968 births
Living people
People from Burlington, Ontario
People from Oakville, Ontario
Actresses from New York City
Actresses from Toronto
Odia people
Canadian actresses of Indian descent
American Academy of Dramatic Arts alumni
Canadian female dancers
Canadian film actresses
Canadian stage actresses
Canadian television actresses
Canadian expatriate actresses in the United States
Canadian expatriate actresses in India
Odissi exponents
20th-century Canadian actresses
21st-century Canadian actresses